Novza is a station of the Tashkent Metro on Chilonzor Line. The station was opened on 6 November 1977 as part of the inaugural section of Tashkent Metro, between October inkilobi and Sabir Rakhimov.  Previously it was called Hamza. June 16, 2015 was renamed the station "Novza" according to the decision of hakim (mayor) Tashkent.

References

Tashkent Metro stations
Railway stations opened in 1977